Nogometni klub Šentjur, commonly referred to as NK Šentjur or simply Šentjur, was a Slovenian football club from Šentjur, which played a total of six seasons in the Slovenian Second League. The club was dissolved in 2000, when a new club, named Mladi upi Šentjur, was founded. The club played their home games at Šentjur Sports Park.

Honours
Slovenian Third League
 Winners: 1994–95

Slovenian Fourth Division
 Winners: 1993–94

MNZ Celje Cup
 Winners: 1994–95, 1995–96, 1996–97, 1999–2000

League history

References

Association football clubs established in 1991
Association football clubs disestablished in 2000
Defunct football clubs in Slovenia
1991 establishments in Slovenia
2000 disestablishments in Slovenia